Melanostigma is a cosmopolitan genus of marine ray-finned fishes belonging to the family Zoarcidae, the eelpouts. The fishes in this genus are found iall round the world.

Species
The following species are classified within the genus Melanostigma:

In addition Catalog of Fishes recognises the following additional species which are not recognised as valid species in FishBase.

References

Gymnelinae
Taxa named by Albert Günther